The family Prophalangopsidae are insects belonging to the order Orthoptera. They are the only extant members of the superfamily Hagloidea. There is only one extant genus in North America, where they are known as grigs, four genera in Asia, and many extinct genera (see below).

The closest living relatives to the Prophalangopsidae are the family Tettigoniidae (katydids or bush-crickets), but the evolutionary split occurred more than 230 million years ago in the Permian.

The female of the species consumes the wings of the male during mating.

Haglidae is often used as a synonym of the family, but is used to refer to a distinct grouping of extinct hagloids by paleontologists.

Subfamilies and genera
The Orthoptera Species File lists the following: Archibald, Gu, and Mathewes (2022) removed the genera †Albertoilus and †Palaeorehnia from the family, moving them to a newly revised †Palaeorehniidae which they considered unplaced as to superfamily.
 Cyphoderrinae Gorochov 1988
 Cyphoderris Uhler, 1864 (NW America)
 Paracyphoderris Storozhenko, 1980 (Siberia)
 Prophalangopsinae Kirby, 1906
 Aboilomimus Gorochov, 2001 (China)
 Prophalangopsis Walker, 1871 (Indian subcontinent)
 Tarragoilus Gorochov, 2001 (China)
 †Jurassobatea Zeuner, 1937 Solnhofen Limestone, Germany, Late Jurassic (Tithonian)
 †Mesoprophalangopsis Hong, 1986 Haifanggou Formation, China, Middle Jurassic (Callovian)
 †Zalmonites Handlirsch, 1906 Green Series, Germany, Early Jurassic (Toarcian)
 †Aboilinae Martynov 1925
 †Aboilus Martynov, 1925
 †Allaboilus Ren & Meng, 2006
 †Angustaboilus Li, Ren & Meng, 2007
 †Apsataboilus Gorochov, 1990
 †Bacharaboilus Gorochov, 1988
 †Baissaboilus Gorochov, 1996
 †Brunneus Hong, 1983
 †Circulaboilus Li, Ren & Wang, 2007
 †Flexaboilus Li, Ren & Meng, 2007
 †Furcaboilus Li, Ren & Wang, 2007
 †Karatailus Gorochov, 1996
 †Notohagla Johns, 1996
 †Novaboilus Li, Ren & Meng, 2007
 †Pamphagopsis Martynov, 1925
 †Procyrtophyllites Zeuner, 1935
 †Prophalangopseides Sharov, 1968
 †Pseudohagla Sharov, 1962
 †Pycnophlebia Deichmuller, 1886
 †Sigmaboilus Fang, Zhang, Wang & Zhang, 2007
 †Sunoprophalangopsis Hong, 1982
 †Tettaboilus Gorochov, 1988
 †Utanaboilus Gorochov, 1990
 †Chifengiinae Hong, 1982
 †Aenigmoilus Gorochov, Jarzembowski & Coram, 2006
 †Aethehagla Meng & Ren, 2006
 †Ashanga Zherikhin, 1985
 †Ashangopsis Lin, Huang & Nel, 2008
 †Chifengia Hong, 1982
 †Grammohagla Meng & Ren, 2006
 †Habrohagla Ren, Lu, Guo & Ji, 1995
 †Hebeihagla Hong, 1982
 †Parahagla Sharov, 1968
 †Protaboilinae Gorochov 1995
 †Protaboilus Gorochov, 1988
 †Termitidiinae Zeuner 1939
 †Agrionidium Westwood, 1854
 †Mesogryllus Handlirsch, 1906
 †Pseudaboilus Gorochov, Jarzembowski & Coram, 2006
 †Termitidium Westwood, 1854
 †Tettigoilus Gorochov, Jarzembowski & Coram, 2006
 †Zalmona Giebel, 1856
 †Tettohaglinae Gorochov 2003
 †Tettohagla Gorochov, 1996
 undetermined subfamily:
 †Cratohaglopsis Martins-Neto, 1991
 †Kevania Martins-Neto, 1991
 †Sinoprophalangopsis Hong, 1983

References

External links
 
 

Orthoptera families
Extant Permian first appearances
Ensifera